Davin is a surname and masculine given name. It may refer to the following people:

Surname
 Dan Davin (1913–1990), New Zealand author of Irish descent
 Daniele Davin (born 1962), Italian retired footballer
 Delia Davin (1944–2016), British sinologist
 Félix Davin (1807–1836), French journalist, novelist and poet
 Franco Davín (born 1970), Argentinian tennis player and coach
 Joe Davin (1942–2013), Scottish footballer
 Martin Davin (1905–1957), Scottish footballer
 Maurice Davin (1842–1927), Irish farmer, co-founder and first president of the Gaelic Athletic Association
 Niko Davin (born 1997), Namibian cricketer
 Nicholas Flood Davin (1840–1901), Irish lawyer, politician and journalist
 Patrick Davin (1962–2020), Belgian orchestra conductor
 Tom Davin, American businessman and CEO
 William Davin (1890–1956), Irish station-master and politician

Given name
 Davin Bellamy (born 1994), American football player
 Davin Joseph (born 1983), American former National Football League player
 Davin Meggett (born 1990), American former football player
 Davin Pierre, American college baseball coach and former player
 Davin White (born 1981), American basketball player

English-language masculine given names